The UMSL Student Government Association (SGA) is a student run government set up to provide a voice for students when dealing with administration of the University of Missouri–St. Louis (UMSL). SGA has three branches, executive, legislative and judicial, and also a constitution. SGA was started in 1963 when the University was founded and has been through many constitutional changes, the most recent in 2004. SGA includes members from every student organization and students from every college on campus. This government incorporates both undergraduate and graduate in its student body. UMSL's SGA, along with the 3 other campuses in the University of Missouri System student governments sends two members to a meeting of what is called the Intercampus Student Council. SGA has been involved in many changes for students around the campus, including getting funds for the Benton Hall renovation. It is responsible for approving student fees before they go to the board of curators of the University of Missouri System and divides out the campus Activity's Fees to fund student organization's budgets.

Mission
The Student Government Association works toward full student participation in all areas of university life, university affairs, and policy making. SGA serves as the student voice to the university administration, faculty, and other campuses. In addition, the SGA implements the philosophy that all students be encouraged to govern themselves and be responsible for their government. The Student Government Association works with the faculty and administration to create and maintain comprehensive and quality academic programs, student services, and activities which contribute to the total development of UM-St. Louis students, alumni, and the metropolitan, state, national, and international community.

Executive Branch

Description
The Executive Branch of the Student Government Association consists of the President, Vice-President and Comptroller. It also includes all of the committees of the Assembly, which are as follows:

MSC Advisory Committee

Infrastructure and Fee Review

Parking, Transportation and Safety

Homecoming

Elections

Bylaws and Rules

Green(Recycling)

President
The President is elected by the entire student body.
Responsibilities of the SGA President are to preside over the Executive Committee (which includes officers of the Assembly), hire any staff, hold a veto power and report to the Assembly about matters concerning the student body. The President also acts as a liaison to the Chancellor and the University Assembly.

Vice-President
The Vice-President is also elected by the entire student body.
Responsibilities of the SGA Vice-President are to coordinate all of the committees in SGA while assisting the President. The Vice-President also serves as a member of the Inter-Campus Student Council (ISC) and is a member of the Executive committee.

Comptroller
The Comptroller is elected by the entire student body. Responsibilities of the SGA Comptroller are to act as a treasurer for SGA and serve as a chair of the Student Activities Budget Committee (SABC, which distributes money to student organizations). The Comptroller also selects members of SABC and represents the committee when needs be.

Assembly

Description
The SGA Assembly is made up of member from every student organizations plus members at large from each college. The Assembly typically meets once a month and is responsible for voting on things ranging from student fees to Student Court members.

Chair
Responsibilities of the Assembly Chair are to lead every meeting of the Assembly. The Chair puts together the agenda for the meeting and is also a member of the Executive committee. The Chair also serves and interim Vice-President or Comptroller until an election can be held to replace the position. The Chair also serves as Vice-Chair and Ex-Offico member of the SABC (Student Activities Budget Committee).

Vice-Chair
Responsibilities of the Assembly Vice-Chair are to assume the duties of the chair or the Sergeant-at-Arms if they are absent. Also the Vice-Chair may vote in the Assembly and is a member of the Executive Committee. The Vice-Chair is to act as a liaison between the Assembly and the Executive Committee for the purpose of communication for all parties involved.

Parliamentarian
Responsibilities of the SGA Parliamentarian are to arbitrate parliamentary procedure questions during Assembly meetings and serve as a non-voting member of the Executive Committee and Assembly.

Sergeant-at-arms
Responsibilities of the SGA Sergeant-at-Arms are to maintain order at Assembly Meetings and take attendance at SGA Assembly meetings. The Sergeant-at-arms is also a member of the Executive Committee

Secretary
Responsibilities of the SGA Secretary are to coordinate all activities pertaining to the SGA. Also the Secretary keeps minutes of all Assembly meetings and meetings of the Executive Committee. The position may vote during meetings of the Assembly and is a member of the Executive Committee.

Student Court

Description
The Student Government Association Student Court consists of seven justices, serving one-year terms. The terms will begin at the second Assembly meeting of the fall semester. Three nominees shall be nominated by the President and approved by the Assembly and four nominees shall be nominated by the Student Government Association Assembly. The nominees will be presented to the Student Government Association Assembly at the first SGA Assembly meeting and voted on individually at the next regularly scheduled meeting. If a justice resigns or is removed from office, the position shall be deemed vacant and shall be filled at the next Assembly meeting.

Responsibilities
The Student Court conducts hearings and reach decisions on student parking appeals along with hearing cases dealing with grievance between individual students and groups of students, groups of students, and conduct Impeachment proceedings. The Student Court also interprets the Student Government Association's Constitution and By-Laws, when requested by a member of the Association.

Programs
SGA puts on a variety of programs including The Big Event, which is a service project. Also SGA holds Parking Town Hall meetings and Whine and Cheese, a place for student to come with concerns about the University.

Accomplishments

University of Missouri name change
The University of Missouri (then called the University of Missouri-Columbia) wanted to change its name to simply the University of Missouri. This was opposed by the student body at UMSL and SGA lobbied the board of curators to keep Mizzou's name the same. A compromise was struck and now the University of Missouri-Columbia may only use University of Missouri under certain conditions.

Online Student Calendar
The master student calendar was started to give student organizations a place to post their events and give students a place to go and see what is happening on any given day. Go to http://sga.umsl.edu/calendar to see more.

Wayne Watch
A tradition started by the campus radio station, TheU, when they put a shirt on the statue of Wayne Goode, one of the founders of the UM-St. Louis campus. The tradition has been carried on by SGA this year. A shirt is placed on Wayne a few days before an event is to take place in order to promote it. So far Wayne has six shirts in his collection. Go to http://sga.umsl.edu/wayne to see more.

Homecoming 2007: Red and Gold Reign
Homecoming was a success this year. Overall, attendance and participation were up this year. There were 880 students who attended the dance and it sold out within 5 days. Attendance for all Spirit Week activities was up; many students came to the Blood Drive, Food Drive, and Karaoke. SGA Participated in ABC Presents...Steppin’ (their Annual Step Show) and there were 6 participants in the BMOC Competition. The Athletic Department participated this year and athletes were in attendance at every event. It was a success and they are currently looking for a new venue for 2008 and are in the process of naming the Co-Chairs.

Parking Rewards Program
SGA helped Parking and Transportation to start the student's reward program. Students are entered into raffles for free parking permits as long as the student has registered the vehicle and received no tickets for the year. For more information log on to: http://www.umsl.edu/~asd/parkingandtransportation/

Readership Program
SGA advocated for a free newspaper service which is currently available to any student with a student ID. The papers include the New York Times, the St. Louis Post-Dispatch, and the USA Today.

South Campus Dining
SGA, along with Residential Life, had been stressing the importance of dining on South campus and this year it paid off. Dining service will start at the beginning of the Spring 2008 semester. Check the SGA website later for times the dining hall will be open.

References

External links
 

Organizations based in Missouri
Student governments in the United States
University of Missouri–St. Louis
1963 establishments in Missouri
Student organizations established in 1963